Nikita Marselovych Mashtakov (born 18 March 1999) is an inactive Ukrainian tennis player.

Mashtakov has a career high ATP singles ranking of 575 achieved on 13 January 2020.

On the junior tour, Mashtakov has a career high ranking of 24, achieved on 23 January 2017.

Mashtakov has represented Ukraine in the Davis Cup, where he has a win–loss record of 0–1.

External links

1999 births
Living people
Ukrainian male tennis players
Sportspeople from Donetsk
21st-century Ukrainian people